New England Law | Boston (formerly New England School of Law) is a private law school in Boston, Massachusetts. It was founded as Portia School of Law in 1908 and is located in downtown Boston near the Massachusetts Supreme Judicial Court, Financial District, State House, Government Center, and numerous state and federal courts, government agencies, and law firms.

According to New England Law's official 2018 ABA-required disclosures, the class of 2018 had a full-time employment rate of 83.4% with 4% pursuing an additional degree. Eight U.S. Supreme Court justices have visited, lectured, or taught in the summer-abroad programs at New England Law.

History

The Portia School of Law 

The Portia School of Law started informally in 1908 when Arthur W. MacLean (1880–1943), a graduate of the Boston University School of Law and a professor at Suffolk University Law School, agreed to tutor two young women who were studying for the Massachusetts bar examination. At the time, few options were available to women seeking a legal education in New England. Soon afterwards, MacLean rented space at 88 Tremont Street, began admitting students, and took on a second faculty member, A. Chesley York. MacLean's wife, Bertha, named the school after the character Portia in Shakespeare's The Merchant of Venice. In the play, Portia disguises herself as a young man, boldly impersonates a judge, replacing her cousin (the real judge), and her clever frauds save her new husband's best friend Antonio from forfeiting a pound of his flesh (and his life) for his failure to repay a loan; she also ruins Shylock, the moneylender. The Portia School of Law was the only law school in the country exclusively for women.

The school was incorporated in 1918. By this time it had 91 students. The following year, the Massachusetts legislature granted the school the power to confer the degree of Bachelor of Laws (LL.B), and the school was reincorporated as the Portia Law School. In 1920 the school awarded its first LL.B degrees to 39 women. The school was one of the few that offered part-time enrollment, enabling working-class women to pursue their studies while supporting themselves.

In 1920, the school outgrew its space on Tremont Street and moved to a townhouse at 45 Mt. Vernon Street on Beacon Hill. The Portia Law School was granted the authority to confer the degree of Master of Laws (LL.M.) in 1926; five graduates were awarded the LL.M. the following year.

The Portia Law School was integrated from its earliest days. Blanche E. Braxton, who graduated in 1921, became the first African-American woman admitted to the Massachusetts bar in 1923. Another Portia graduate, Dorothy Crockett, became the first African-American woman admitted to the Rhode Island bar in 1932. The former site of the Portia Law School at 45 Mount Vernon Street is a stop on the Boston Women's Heritage Trail.

Admission of male students

The school began admitting male students out of financial necessity in the 1920s. In 1930, the school's first two male graduates received the LL.M. degree. From 1940 to 1950, the men's program was referred to as the Calvin Coolidge Law School.

As the school entered the 1950s it saw its student body shift from a student body that had a majority female population to a predominantly male student body. 1963 saw Portia Law School begin the process of applying for American Bar Association accreditation, and some of the steps the school took included restructuring its board of governors and launching the school's first law review. In 1969, the school changed its name to New England School of Law to coincide with its accreditation granted by the ABA.

As New England Law neared its 75th anniversary, new programs were started, the first was the creation of Law Day in 1970 and then the opening of its clinical law services office in 1971. The clinical law services program is performed by the law students providing representation to those who did not have the economic means to seek paid legal assistance.
In 1980, New England moved into its current location; which is located in the Boston Theater District neighborhood. To honor the 75th anniversary of New England Law the 41st President, George H. W. Bush, was the keynote speaker for the celebration.

In the 1980s, the school started a program that arranged for students to study abroad and work with former Soviet Bloc nations to develop their own legal systems. New England Law also became a co-founder of the Consortium for Innovative Legal Education; which allows students to study abroad at countries throughout the world and learn about foreign law and put their current education to work through externships. In 1996, New England Law students worked with Office of the Prosecutor of the International Criminal Tribunals by providing legal research and analysis for war crimes in Rwanda and the former nation of Yugoslavia.
New England Law received membership from the Association of American Law Schools in 1998. In 2002, New England Law expanded its campus by buying adjacent buildings around the schools current location. Also, in 2008, New England School of Law began a new campaign to rebrand itself as "New England Law | Boston", with the purpose to put an emphasis on its location.

In December 2020, long-time president John F. O'Brien stepped down and former United States Senator from Massachusetts and U.S. Ambassador to New Zealand, Scott P. Brown, was named the new president and dean of the school. Brown resigned in August 2021, citing a difference of vision from that of the board of directors.

In January 2022, The Board of Trustees of New England Law | Boston selected long-time professor, Lisa R. Freudenheim, to lead the law school as its next dean.

Campus

The law school's main academic building is a five-story building on Stuart Street in the Boston Theater District, which includes classrooms, faculty offices, law review offices, and the school's library. Clinic, admissions, administrative, and other offices are in a nearby building in the Bay Village on Church Street. Tufts University utilizes New England Law's Bookstore.

A valuable resource-sharing partnership has been forged between New England Law library and the library associated with Tufts medical, dental and veterinary schools. Current students, faculty and staff of each institution have on-site access to each other's collections, which in the case of Tufts means an extensive medical journal collection and a reference collection of basic works, including such things as medical dictionaries, general textbooks, and narrowly subject-specific monographs.

Students have access to the Tufts University Medical Library, and have access to 24 other law school libraries via the New England Law Library Consortium (NELLCO).

Academics
New England Law offers full-time and part-time (both day and evening) Juris Doctor programs, with an application deadline of May 1. In 2021, the entering class had Law School Admission Test (LSAT) scores in the range of 149 to 157 (25th–75th percentile). New England Law has approximately 600 students.

New England Law has seven concentrations, including in immigration law and intellectual property law and offers an LL.M. in American Law. New England Law also offers a program where a student may spend a period of time up to two academic semesters at a law school associated with the Consortium for Innovative Legal Education, Inc. (CILE). The schools taking part in the program include California Western School of Law, South Texas College of Law, and Mitchell Hamline School of Law.

Accreditation and rankings
New England Law is American Bar Association (ABA) accredited and is a member of the Association of American Law Schools. It is also a founding member of the Consortium for Innovative Legal Education.

New England Law is ranked No. 147-193 among law schools and No. 55-70 among part-time law schools by U.S. News.

According to the Princeton Review, New England Law is ranked the 3rd best law school with the greatest resources for women based on two criteria: student surveys and the percentage of the student body that are women.

Cost and student debt
The total cost of attendance (indicating the cost of tuition, fees, and living expenses) at New England Law for the 2021–2022 academic year is $52,288 for full-time students and $39,216 for evening and part-time students.

Employment outcomes

According to New England Law's official 2018 ABA-required disclosures, the class of 2018 had an employment rate of 83% with 4% pursuing an additional degree.

Centers
The Center for Law and Social Responsibility, CLSR, works mostly pro bono and public service activities. It is run and supported by students, faculty and alumni. The CLSR serves as a socially responsible organization that works with numerous projects that are representative of its members, as well as issues that public service lawyers are currently working with. The CLSR also works to support classroom projects, scholarship, and other activities that convey current social problems.

The Center for International Law and Policy, CILP, is utilized by both students and faculty for research, analysis and produce resource material on numerous topics. Some of the topics include CIA renditions in Europe, intergovernmental peacekeeper accountability and hate speech. Students also have the chance to practice international law in overseas externships. Most students work assist in prosecutions related to war crimes, because of the schools relationships with international criminal courts and tribunals. CILP also hosts the annual international law conference, by creating more awareness in global legal work, for issues such as Chinese unification and Taiwanese independence, competition laws, responses to rogue regimes, the Rwandan genocide, and the development of new countries out of the former Yugoslavia.

New England Law's Center for Business Law offers academic credit in conjunction with legal externship positions through one of the CBL's three institutes, which individually focus on corporate governance and ethics, intellectual property, and tax law. Typical placements include Liberty Mutual, RNK Telecommunication, Natural Microsystems, Inc., the Boston Stock Exchange, and the National Association of Securities Dealers.

Clinics
New England Law offers more than a dozen clinics each semester in a wide range of areas including public interest, tax law, administrative law, criminal law, family law, health law, immigration law, land use law, and mediation. Students are eligible to participate in clinics in the first semester of their second year of law school.

Notable alumni
New England Law's notable alumni include:

Blanche E. Braxton, first African American woman to be admitted to the Massachusetts bar;
Paula M. Carey, chief justice of the Massachusetts Trial Court;
Susan J. Crawford, the first woman to be appointed to the United States Court of Appeals for the Armed Forces, former Inspector General of the Department of Defense, and former Convening Authority of the Guantanamo Military Commissions
Dorothy Crockett, first African American woman to be admitted to the Rhode Island bar;
Thomas J. Curry, former comptroller at the United States Office of the Comptroller of the Currency;
Brian Darling, director of United States Senate relations for the Heritage Foundation;
Joseph R. Driscoll, Norfolk member of the Massachusetts House of Representatives;
Mitchell Garabedian, lawyer best known for representing victims during the Catholic priest sexual abuse scandal;
Virgil Hawkins, activist best known for Florida ex Rel. Hawkins v. Board of Control Supreme Court case
Glenn Kirschner, prosecutor and television commentator;
Joseph Mondello, United States Ambassador to Trinidad and Tobago from 2018 to 2021
Wendy Murphy, attorney, professor, and author;
James E. O'Neil, Rhode Island Attorney General, 1987 to 1993
Joseph Petty, mayor of Worcester, Massachusetts;
Karyn Polito, Massachusetts lieutenant governor;
Janine D. Rivers, Associate Justice of the Suffolk County Probate and Family Court
Mark John Richard Simpson, director of the United States Secret Service;
Lori St John, anti-death penalty activist;
Timothy F. Sullivan, chief justice of the Massachusetts Housing Court;
Andrew Vachss, children's lawyer and author of the Burke novels;
Martha Ware, Massachusetts district court judge; and
Leonard P. Zakim, religious and civil rights leader in Boston

References

External links
 Official website

 
Educational institutions established in 1908
Universities and colleges in Boston
Independent law schools in the United States
Boston Theater District
1908 establishments in Massachusetts
Private universities and colleges in Massachusetts